

References

Dr. Slump
Episodes